The Wilson Cup was a Scottish football trophy donated by Robert Wilson (1871-1928), who was the editor of the Edinburgh Evening News and a director of Heart of Midlothian. The cup was played annually between Edinburgh derby rivals Heart of Midlothian and Hibernian. It was either played on 1 January, at the beginning of the season or at the end.

The competition ran from the 1905–06 season to the 1945–46 season, Hearts winning 21 times and Hibs 14.

Initially intended to be a trophy for the winner of the annual New Year Scottish Football League fixture between the clubs before becoming a challenge match in its own right, on a few occasions the game was played as part of a 'double header', also counting for the East of Scotland Shield. In May 1919 the 2nd leg of the Shield counted as the Wilson Cup final replay. In May 1920 the Shield replay counted as the final of the Wilson Cup and in 1921 it counted as the semi-final of the Shield as well.

See also
East of Scotland Shield
Rosebery Charity Cup

References

Edinburgh football competitions
Recurring sporting events established in 1906
1946 disestablishments in the United Kingdom
Heart of Midlothian F.C.
Hibernian F.C.
Defunct football cup competitions in Scotland
1906 establishments in Scotland